Carl Geyling's Erben is a traditional Austrian stained glassmaker. The company has its headquarters in Vienna.

History 

It is one of the oldest businesses still extant in Austria and one of the oldest in its field. It was founded in 1841 by the stained glass artist Carl Geyling (1814–1880). Geyling became very successful in his field and expanded his business. His name became known outside the Austrian empire.

The company has received many commissions for public and private buildings. The owners also received an imperial warrant and became Purveyors to the Imperial and Royal Court.

Carl Geyling's Erben also worked closely together with artists of the Wiener Werkstätte, such as Josef von Führich and Koloman Moser.

External links 

 Homepage of Carl Geyling's Erben

Manufacturing companies based in Vienna
Purveyors to the Imperial and Royal Court
Stained glass artists and manufacturers